Cloverdale may refer to:

Place names
Australia
Cloverdale, Western Australia

Canada
Cloverdale, Edmonton, Alberta, a neighborhood
Cloverdale, Surrey, British Columbia
Cloverdale, New Brunswick
Cloverdale, Nova Scotia
Cloverdale Mall in Toronto, Ontario

United States
Cloverdale, Montgomery, Alabama
Cloverdale Historic District, Montgomery, Alabama, listed on the NRHP in Alabama
Cloverdale, California
Cloverdale, Indiana
Cloverdale, Iowa
Cloverdale, Kansas
Cloverdale, Minnesota
Cloverdale, Mississippi
Cloverdale, Missouri
Cloverdale archaeological site, Missouri
Cloverdale, Ohio
in Oregon:
Cloverdale, Oregon, in Tillamook County (census-designated place)
Cloverdale, Deschutes County, Oregon (unincorporated community)
Cloverdale, Lane County, Oregon (unincorporated community)
Hamlet of Cloverdale, in Westford, Vermont
Cloverdale, Virginia
Cloverdale (Washington, D.C.), a Colonial Revival home listed on the NRHP in Washington, D.C.
Cloverdale, Monroe County, West Virginia
Cloverdale, Pleasants County, West Virginia
Cloverdale, Wisconsin

Other uses
 Cloverdale Corporation, publishing corporation
Cloverdale, an episode from the TV show Stargate Universe